The Rwanda national under-20 football team represents Rwanda in football at this age level and is controlled by the Rwandese Association Football Federation. The team competes for the African U-20 Championship, held every two years, and the FIFA U-20 World Cup.

Current squad
The following players called up for the 2015 African U-20 Championship qualification matches against South Sudan.

References

African national under-20 association football teams
under-20